The Eight Immortals are ancient revered figures of Daoism.

Eight Immortals may also refer to:

People
Eight Immortals of Huainan, also known as the Eight Gentlemen, eight scholars of the Western Han Dynasty
Eight Immortals from Sichuan, known since the Jin Dynasty
Eight Immortals of the Wine Cup, eight Tang dynasty scholars known for their love of alcohol
Eight Elders of the Chinese Communist Party in the late 1980s and early 1990s

Places
Mountains of the Eight Immortals, the eight peaks of Pat Sin Leng, in the northeast New Territories of Hong Kong
Eight Immortals Mountain, Pa-hsien Mountain, in central Taiwan

Other uses
Eight Immortals (film), a 1971 Taiwanese/Hong Kong fantasy film
Eight Immortals Restaurant murders, a 1985 crime committed in Macau

See also 
Immortal (disambiguation)